Matias Eduardo Cortese (born 1 October 1985 in Ampuero) is an Argentine rugby union player.

Cortese joined Northampton Saints in the Aviva Premiership for the 2006/07 season on a two-year contract. After his release, Cortese then spent seasons with French sides Biarritz Olympique and Bayonne, before he returned to Argentina to join Pampas XV where they won the 2011 Vodacom Cup.

On 24 May 2011, Cortese was signed by Gloucester Rugby for the 2011/12 season. On 22 June 2012, following his release from Gloucester, he signed for French club US Colomiers in the Pro D2, the second level of domestic rugby union in France.

Matias Cortese won his first cap with Argentina where he made his international debut in 2005, as a replacement, against Samoa in an international friendly losing at 12-28. His other two test match appearances came in the 2010 South American Championship with Cortese playing against Chile and Uruguay. He was recalled to Argentina squad for the 2014 summer-test series held in June.

References

Toulon sign Argentina hooker. http://www.planetrugby.com/story/0,25883,9818_9578853,00.html

1985 births
Living people
Argentine rugby union players
Argentina international rugby union players
Rugby union hookers
Sportspeople from Mendoza, Argentina
Northampton Saints players
Biarritz Olympique players
Aviron Bayonnais players
Pampas XV players
Gloucester Rugby players
Argentine expatriate rugby union players
Expatriate rugby union players in France
Argentine expatriate sportspeople in France